The following is a list of notable cases that have been considered by the Federal Court of Australia.

See also
List of High Court of Australia cases

 
Australia
Federal
Australian case law